Midnight Passion may refer to:

 "Midnight Passion", the working title of "Moonlight Shadow", a song by British musician Mike Oldfield
 Midnight Passion, a 1991 album by Freddie Ravel